Isaac Shelby Cemetery State Historic Site is a park in Lincoln County, Kentucky. It marks the estate and burial ground of Kentucky's first governor, Isaac Shelby. The site became part of the park system in 1951.

References

External links
 Isaac Shelby Cemetery State Historic Site Kentucky Department of Parks
 

Cemeteries in Kentucky
Kentucky State Historic Sites
National Register of Historic Places in Lincoln County, Kentucky
Protected areas established in 1951
Protected areas of Lincoln County, Kentucky
Buildings and structures in Lincoln County, Kentucky
Cemeteries on the National Register of Historic Places in Kentucky
1951 establishments in Kentucky